Schnarcherklippen is the name of a rock formation (up to 671 m above sea level) south of the village of Schierke in the High Harz mountains of Saxony-Anhalt in central Germany. The name translates roughly to "snoring crags" or "snoring rocks".

Geology 
Another feature of the Schnarcherklippen is that they deflect compass needles away from magnetic north due to the presence of magnetite in the rock.

Access 
The shortest way to the Schnarcherklippen rocks is by footpath from the Schierke. From the top of the rocks there is a view over the whole of the surrounding area, including the Bärenkopf, the holiday resort of Schierke, the Erdbeerkopf, the Brocken massif and the Wurmberg. The Schnarcherklippen are checkpoint no. 14 in the Harzer Wandernadel hiking trail network.

Climbing 
The northeastern pinnacle may be ascended using an iron ladder, but the southwestern rocks are only accessible to climbers. There are various climbing routes of grades I to VIIIb (Saxon grading) on the southwestern rocks and from IV to IXc on the northeastern rocks.

Name 
When the wind blows from the southeast the rocks make a strange sound which was the inspiration for its name (schnarchen = "snoring").

Goethe and the crags 
On his third journey to the Harz in September 1784 Johann Wolfgang von Goethe visited the Schnarcherklippen. They are mentioned in the Walpurgis Night scene of Faust I and in Faust II:

See also 
 List of rock formations in the Harz

References

External links
YouTube video showing the magnetism phenomenon

Rock formations of Saxony-Anhalt
Rock formations of the Harz
Wernigerode